Sikhumbuzo Notshe (born 28 May 1993) is a South African professional rugby union player who currently plays for the Cell C Sharks in Super Rugby and  in the Currie Cup. His regular playing position is flanker.

Career

Youth

Notshe represented  at all youth levels. He played for them at the Under-13 Craven Week in 2006, at the Under-16 Grant Khomo Week in 2009 and at the Under-18 Craven Week competitions in both 2010 and 2011.

At the conclusion of the 2010 Craven Week competition, Notshe was included in a South African Under-18 High Performance squad that played in matches against France, Namibia and England. The following year, he made the S.A. Schools side that played against France.

Notshe also represented Wynberg Boys' High School between 2010 and 2012.

Senior career

Notshe was included in the  pre-season training squad prior to the 2014 Super Rugby season and was one of the try-scorers in their trial match against .

As of 2020 Notshe has signed a contract with the Cell C Sharks and will join their Super Rugby team.

International rugby

On 28 May 2016, Notshe was included in a 31-man  squad for their three-test match series against a touring  team. After training with the national team for a few days, he joined the South Africa 'A' squad for their two-match series against a touring England Saxons team. He was named in the starting line-up for their first match in Bloemfontein and scored one of his side's three tries in the match, but ended on the losing side as the visitors ran out 32–24 winners.

References

External links
 

South African rugby union players
Living people
1993 births
Sportspeople from Qonce
Stormers players
Western Province (rugby union) players
Rugby union flankers
Alumni of Wynberg Boys' High School
South Africa international rugby union players
Sharks (rugby union) players
Sharks (Currie Cup) players
Rugby union players from the Eastern Cape